The Good-Luck Horse is a children's picture book illustrated by Plato Chan, adapted from a folk tale by his mother Chih-yi Chan. Plato Chan was the son of a Chinese diplomat and a child prodigy; he was twelve when he illustrated the book. The Good-Luck Horse was published by Whittlesey House in 1943. It was a 1944 Caldecott Medal honoree. This story has adventures of a horse that a boy had made out of paper and then changed into a real horse by a magician. He was named the good-luck horse because his fortunes fell and rose.

Plot
The Good-Luck Horse is based on a Chinese folk-tale. It tells the story of a paper horse that was created by a kind magician. Since the horse was magical it was able to do anything it was told to do. The horse then became a problem because it was bringing bad luck to its owner until the horse ran away. When a war broke out the horse met another horse and together they were able to end the war, earning him the name of the good-luck horse.

See also
The old man lost his horse, the original story

References

1943 children's books
American picture books
Caldecott Honor-winning works
Children's books about China